Torkamanchay (also Romanized as Torkamānchāy, Torkamān Chāy, Torkmancāy, Turkmanchai, Turkemanchay, Turkomanchay, Turkmānchāi, Torkamān Chāy, Torkamānchāi, and Turcoman Chie; also known simply as Torkamān) is a city in Torkamanchay District of Mianeh County, East Azerbaijan province, Iran.

At the 2006 census, its population was 6,434 in 1,645 households. The following census in 2011 counted 7,094 people in 1,984 households. The latest census in 2016 showed a population of 7,443 people in 2,366 households. A suburb of Mianeh, it is well known for the Treaty of Turkmenchay of 1828.

See also
 Treaty of Turkmenchay
 Treaty of Gulistan

References 

Meyaneh County

Cities in East Azerbaijan Province

Populated places in East Azerbaijan Province

Populated places in Meyaneh County